The 1998–99 season was the 100th season of competitive league football in the history of English football club Wolverhampton Wanderers. They played the season in the second tier of the English football system, the Football League First Division.

The season began with Mark McGhee as manager but he left "by mutual agreement" on 5 November after a run of two victories from fourteen games; the team having begun with four consecutive league wins. Upon McGhee's departure his assistant Colin Lee was placed in charge of the team and, after taking ten points from a possible twelve, he was handed the post for the remainder of the season.

The team finished in seventh place, one position short of the play-offs. Results on the final day, including their own, failed to go in their favour and so they missed out on a chance of promotion to the Premier League. Nonetheless, following the final match, the Wolves board announced that Colin Lee was to be given a permanent contract as manager.

Results

Pre-season

Football League First Division

A total of 24 teams competed in the Football League First Division in the 1998–99 season. Each team played every other team twice: once at their stadium, and once at the opposition's. Three points were awarded to teams for each win, one point per draw, and none for defeats. Teams finishing level on points were firstly divided by the number of goals scored rather than goal difference.

The provisional fixture list was released on 15 June 1998, but was subject to change in the event of matches being selected for television coverage or police concerns.

Final table

Source: Statto.com

Results summary

Results by round

FA Cup

League Cup

Players

|-
|align="left"|||align="left"| 
|0||0||0||0||0||0||0||0||0||0||
|-
|align="left"|||align="left"| 
|0||0||0||0||0||0||0||0||0||0||
|-
|align="left"|||style="background:#faecc8" align="left"|  ‡
|0||0||0||0||0||0||0||0||0||0||
|-
|align="left"|||align="left"| 
|46||0||2||0||4||0||52||0||0||0||
|-
|align="left"|||align="left"|  (c)
|44||4||2||0||3||0||49||4||8||1||
|-
|align="left"|||align="left"| 
|||0||0||0||0||0||||0||0||0||
|-
|align="left"|||align="left"| 
|||4||2||0||4||0||||4||12||0||
|-
|align="left"|||align="left"| 
|||1||0||0||4||0||||1||0||0||
|-
|align="left"|||align="left"| 
|||3||1||0||4||0||||3||5||0||
|-
|align="left"|||align="left"| 
|0||0||0||0||0||0||0||0||0||0||
|-
|align="left"|||align="left"| 
|0||0||0||0||1||0||||0||0||0||
|-
|align="left"|||align="left"| 
|15||0||2||0||||0||||0||0||1||
|-
|align="left"|||align="left"| 
|||2||1||0||||0||||2||1||0||
|-
|align="left"|||align="left"| 
|||2||2||0||||0||||2||3||0||
|-
|align="left"|||align="left"|  ¤
|||0||0||0||||1||||1||1||0||
|-
|align="left"|||align="left"|  †
|||0||0||0||||0||||0||2||0||
|-
|align="left"|||align="left"| 
|||0||2||0||||0||||0||3||0||
|-
|align="left"|||align="left"| 
|||2||1||0||2||0||style="background:#98FB98"|||2||0||0||
|-
|align="left"|||align="left"| 
|0||0||0||0||0||0||0||0||0||0||
|-
|align="left"|||align="left"| 
|||0||1||0||0||0||style="background:#98FB98"|||0||1||0||
|-
|align="left"|||align="left"| 
|||2||1||0||4||1||||3||9||0||
|-
|align="left"|||align="left"| 
|||8||2||0||1||0||||8||4||0||
|-
|align="left"|||align="left"| 
|||3||||0||3||0||||3||8||0||
|-
|align="left"|||align="left"|  ¤
|||2||||0||1||0||||2||0||0||
|-
|align="left"|||align="left"| 
|0||0||0||0||0||0||0||0||0||0||
|-
|align="left"|FW||align="left"| 
|||3||0||0||2||3||||6||1||0||
|-
|align="left"|FW||align="left"|  †
|0||0||0||0||0||0||0||0||0||0||
|-
|align="left"|FW||style="background:#faecc8" align="left"|  ‡
|||6||||0||2||0||style="background:#98FB98"|||6||1||0||
|-
|align="left"|FW||align="left"|  ¤†
|0||0||0||0||0||0||0||0||0||0||
|-
|align="left"|FW||align="left"| 
|||5||1||1||0||0||style="background:#98FB98"|||6||1||0||
|-
|align="left"|FW||align="left"|  ¤
|||2||0||0||0||0||||2||0||0||
|-
|align="left"|FW||align="left"| 
|||0||0||0||||0||||0||1||0||
|-
|align="left"|FW||align="left"| 
|||11||2||2||4||3||||16||1||0||
|-
|align="left"|FW||align="left"| 
|0||0||0||0||0||0||0||0||0||0||
|-
|align="left"|FW||align="left"|  †
|0||0||0||0||0||0||0||0||0||0||
|-
|align="left"|FW||align="left"| 
|0||0||0||0||0||0||0||0||0||0||
|-
|align="left"|FW||style="background:#faecc8" align="left"|  ‡
|||1||0||0||0||0||||1||0||0||
|}

Transfers

In

Out

Loans in

Loans out

Kit
The season brought a new home kit as the design returned to a plain gold shirt with black collar. The away kit, a white away shirt with a dark green collar and dark green shorts, was retained from the previous season. Both were manufactured by Puma and sponsored by Goodyear.

References

1998–99
Wolverhampton Wanderers